The 1998 Masters Tournament was the 62nd Masters Tournament, held from April 9–12 at Augusta National Golf Club. Mark O'Meara won his first major championship with a  birdie putt on the final hole to win by one stroke over runners-up David Duval and Fred Couples.
 He birdied three of the final four holes in a final round 67 (−5).

In one of the most remarkable performances of his career, Jack Nicklaus tied for sixth place at the age of 58. His final round 68 (−4) yielded a 283 (−5), the lowest 72-hole score by a player over age 50 at the Masters.  Nicklaus was in contention for the title until well into the back nine holes in the final round.  It was his last serious run for a major championship, twelve years after his sixth Masters victory in 1986.

In his first Masters, David Toms shot a 29 (−7) on the back nine on Sunday, en route to a 64 (−8). He had six consecutive birdies on holes 12–17.

O'Meara's win came in his 15th attempt at Augusta, setting a record for appearances before a victory. He had previously been considered one of the best players to never win a major. Later in July, he won the Open Championship and earned PGA Tour Player of the Year honors for 1998.

Matt Kuchar, a 19-year-old sophomore at Georgia Tech, was the low amateur at even-par 288 and tied for 21st place. The reigning U.S. Amateur champion, he carded a four-under 68 in the third round.

Field
1. Masters champions
Tommy Aaron, Seve Ballesteros, Gay Brewer, Billy Casper, Charles Coody, Fred Couples (9,12), Ben Crenshaw, Nick Faldo, Raymond Floyd, Doug Ford, Bernhard Langer (9), Sandy Lyle, Larry Mize, Jack Nicklaus, José María Olazábal (9,10), Arnold Palmer, Gary Player, Craig Stadler, Tom Watson (9), Tiger Woods (9,12,13), Ian Woosnam, Fuzzy Zoeller
George Archer, Jack Burke Jr., Bob Goalby, Herman Keiser, Cary Middlecoff, Byron Nelson, Gene Sarazen, Sam Snead, and Art Wall Jr. did not play.

2. U.S. Open champions (last five years)
Ernie Els (9,10,12,13), Lee Janzen (11,13), Steve Jones (12,13), Corey Pavin

3. The Open champions (last five years)
John Daly, Tom Lehman (9,10,13), Justin Leonard (9,11,12,13), Greg Norman (12,13), Nick Price (4,9,12,13)

4. PGA champions (last five years)
Paul Azinger, Mark Brooks, Steve Elkington (9,13), Davis Love III (9,10,11,12,13)

5. U.S. Amateur champion and runner-up
Joel Kribel (a), Matt Kuchar (a)

6. The Amateur champion
Craig Watson (a)

7. U.S. Amateur Public Links champion
Tim Clark (a)

8. U.S. Mid-Amateur champion
Ken Bakst (a)

9. Top 24 players and ties from the 1997 Masters
Stuart Appleby (13), Mark Calcavecchia (12,13), Fred Funk, John Huston (12), Per-Ulrik Johansson, Tom Kite (11), Jesper Parnevik (12,13), Costantino Rocca, Vijay Singh (12,13), Jeff Sluman, Paul Stankowski (13), Tommy Tolles (10,13), Lee Westwood, Willie Wood

10. Top 16 players and ties from the 1997 U.S. Open
Billy Andrade, Olin Browne, Stewart Cink (12,13), Jim Furyk (11,13), Jay Haas, Scott Hoch (11,12,13), Bradley Hughes, Jeff Maggert (11,13), Scott McCarron (12,13), Colin Montgomerie, David Ogrin, Bob Tway

Loren Roberts (12,13) was unable to compete due to a rib injury.

11. Top eight players and ties from 1997 PGA Championship
Phil Blackmar (12)

12. Winners of PGA Tour events since the previous Masters
Michael Bradley, Billy Ray Brown, David Duval (13), David Frost, Bill Glasson (13), Tim Herron, Gabriel Hjertstedt, Billy Mayfair, Phil Mickelson (13), Frank Nobilo (13), Scott Simpson, David Toms

13. Top 30 players from the 1997 PGA Tour money list
John Cook, Brad Faxon, Andrew Magee, Mark O'Meara

14. Special foreign invitation
Darren Clarke, Ignacio Garrido, Retief Goosen, Shigeki Maruyama, Masashi Ozaki

Round summaries

First round
Thursday, April 9, 1998
Friday, April 10, 1998

First round suspended by darkness; start was delayed by 90 minutes to get course playable after heavy rains Wednesday night.

Second round
Friday, April 10, 1998

Source:

Amateurs: Kuchar (+4), Kribel (+6), Watson (+13), Clark (+14), Bakst (+16).

Third round
Saturday, April 11, 1998

Final round
Sunday, April 12, 1998

Final leaderboard

Sources:

Scorecard

Cumulative tournament scores, relative to par
{|class="wikitable" span = 50 style="font-size:85%;
|-
|style="background: Red;" width=10|
|Eagle
|style="background: Pink;" width=10|
|Birdie
|style="background: PaleGreen;" width=10|
|Bogey
|style="background: Green;" width=10|
|Double bogey
|}
Source:

References

External links
Masters.com – Past winners and results
Augusta.com – 1998 Masters leaderboard and scorecards

1998
1998 in golf
1998 in American sports
1998 in sports in Georgia (U.S. state)
April 1998 sports events in the United States